Canteria is a fungal genus in the family Endochytriaceae. A monotypic genus, it contain the single species Canteria apophysata, a parasite of the alga Mougeotia. The genus was circumscribed by John S. Karling in 1971.

References

External links

Chytridiomycota genera
Monotypic fungi genera